Nadeem Javed is an Indian politician, affiliated to Indian National Congress. He served as the MLA representing the Jaunpur of Uttar Pradesh from 2012 to 2017. He was appointed as the chairman of All India Minority Congress, minority department of Indian National Congress, in May 2018.

Political career 
In March 2012, Javed won the Jaunpur (Assembly constituency) in 2012 Uttar Pradesh Legislative Assembly election, securing 50,863 votes for Indian National Congress. In 2017, he lost the UP assembly election from Jaunpur constituency.

In May 2018, he was appointed as chairperson of All India Congress Committee's Minority department by Rahul Gandhi.

He also has served as national president of All India Congress Committee students' wing National Students' Union of India and later, general secretary of Indian Youth Congress. He also served as a National Media Panelist for All India Congress Committee.

Personal life 
Nadeem Javed is married to Asma Nadeem Javed and they have two children, one son and one daughter.

Posts held

See also 

 Uttar Pradesh Legislative Assembly

References

Uttar Pradesh MLAs 2012–2017
Living people
Indian National Congress politicians from Uttar Pradesh
1976 births